Gawronski is a surname. Notable people with the surname include:

Anthony P. Gawronski (1900–1972), American lawyer and politician 
Bertram Gawronski (born 1971), German psychologist
Jas Gawronski (born 1936), Italian journalist and politician

Surnames of Polish origin